The 1984 Clásica de San Sebastián was the fourth edition of the Clásica de San Sebastián cycle race and was held on 16 August 1984. The race started and finished in San Sebastián. The race was won by Niki Rüttimann.

General classification

References

Clásica de San Sebastián
San